Balochistan National Party may refer to:

 Balochistan National Party (Awami)
 Balochistan National Party (Mengal)